Ruslan Poladov (born 30 November 1979) is an Azerbaijani football player currently playing for Qaradağ Lökbatan in the Azerbaijan First Division

Career

Club
In May 2014, Poladov signed a one-year contract with Sumgayit. Zira announced on 23 May that Poladov had left the club at the end of his contract.

International

Poladov made his debut, and only appearance to date, for Azerbaijan on 12 October 2005 coming on as an 88th-minute substitute for Emin Imamaliev in their 2-0 away defeat to Wales in the 2006 World Cup qualification match.

Career statistics

Club

References

Living people
1979 births
Azerbaijani footballers
Ravan Baku FC players
Shamakhi FK players
Khazar Lankaran FK players
Simurq PIK players
Sumgayit FK players
Zira FK players
Azerbaijan international footballers
Association football defenders
People from Sumgait
FK Genclerbirliyi Sumqayit players